Ali Dost Khan, often referred to as Dost Ali Khan, was the Nawab of the Carnatic from 1732 to 1740. He was the son of Ghulam Ali Khan, brother of the Nawab Saadatullah Khan. His childless uncle adopted him as heir, and he succeeded his uncle in 1732, he successfully gained the investiture and an official Firman by the Mughal Emperor Muhammad Shah.

Ali Dost Khan was killed on 20 May 1740 in the Battle of Damalcherry with Raghoji I Bhonsle of the Maratha Empire.

Titles held

See also
Carnatic Wars

References

1740 deaths
Indian Muslims
Nawabs of the Carnatic
Year of birth unknown